Walter Becker (18 October 1932 – 7 June 2012) was a German cyclist. He competed in the individual and team road race events at the 1952 Summer Olympics.

References

External links
 

1932 births
2012 deaths
German male cyclists
Olympic cyclists of Germany
Cyclists at the 1952 Summer Olympics
People from Kaiserslautern
People from the Palatinate (region)
Cyclists from Rhineland-Palatinate